Whitchurch may refer to:

Places

Canada 
Whitchurch, Ontario, since 1971 part of Whitchurch-Stouffville, Ontario

England
Whitchurch, Bristol
Whitchurch, Buckinghamshire
Whitchurch, Devon, in Tavistock
Whitchurch, Devon (parish), a civil parish in Devon
Whitchurch, Hampshire
Whitchurch, Herefordshire
Whitchurch, Middlesex, a former name for Little Stanmore
Whitchurch, Shropshire
Whitchurch, Warwickshire
Whitchurch Canonicorum, Dorset
Whitchurch-on-Thames, Oxfordshire

Wales 
Whitchurch, Cardiff, Wales
Whitchurch, Pembrokeshire, near St. David's
Whitchurch-by-Cardigan, Pembrokeshire (usually called Eglwyswen)

People 
Aaron Whitchurch (born 1992), Australian rugby league player
Ernie Whitchurch (1891–1957), English footballer
Harry Frederick Whitchurch (1866–1907), English soldier
Philip Whitchurch (born 1951), British actor

See also 
Whitchurch (UK Parliament constituency)
Whitchurch railway station (disambiguation)
Whitchurch Rural District (disambiguation)
Whitechurch (disambiguation)

Language equivalents
Weisskirchen (disambiguation) (German-language equivalents)
Whitkirk (disambiguation)
Whitekirk, East Lothian, Scotland, a village